Open Directory may refer to:

 The Open Directory Project (ODP), a human-maintained directory of websites also known as DMOZ
 Apple Open Directory, an LDAP-compatible directory service for Mac OS X Server
 The Sun Open Directory Service (OpenDS) project